The 1974 Pau Grand Prix was a Formula Two motor race held on 5 May 1974 at the Pau circuit, in Pau, Pyrénées-Atlantiques, France. The Grand Prix was won by Patrick Depailler, driving the March 742. Jacques Laffite finished second and Andy Sutcliffe third.

Classification

Race

References

Pau Grand Prix
1974 in French motorsport